John Lindsay ( – 1679), Earl of Crawford and Earl of Lindsay, was a Scottish noble.

Early life
Lindsay was born . He was the eldest son of Robert Lindsay, 9th Lord Lindsay and Lady Christian Hamilton. His younger sister, Helen Lindsay, married Sir William Scott of Ardross in 1634. After the death of his father in 1616, his mother married Robert Boyd, 7th Lord Boyd.

His paternal grandparents were James Lindsay, 7th Lord Lindsay (a gentleman of King James's bedchamber) and Lady Eupheme Leslie (eldest daughter of Andrew Leslie, 5th Earl of Rothes). His mother was the eldest daughter of Thomas Hamilton, 1st Earl of Haddington and the former Margaret Borthwick (only child of James Borthwick of Newbyres). Upon the death of his paternal uncle, John Lindsay, 8th Lord Lindsay, the estate of Byres was sold on his death to his maternal grandfather, Lord Haddington.

Career
Upon the death of his father in 1616, he became the 10th Lord Lindsay of the Byres. In 1633, he was created Earl of Lindsay. He also received the earldom of Crawford following the forfeiture of his cousin, Ludovic Lindsay, 16th Earl of Crawford, in November 1652 (under the terms of the 1641/2 regrant of the Earldom of Crawford).

He became Treasurer of Scotland in 1644, and in 1645 President of Parliament. During the Wars of the Three Kingdoms he played a complex role, but his position was basically a moderate Presbyterian "Engager" one.  He fought for the army of the Scots Parliament at the Battle of Marston Moor, and against the royalist general Montrose at the Battle of Kilsyth, and was eventually captured by the English at Alyth.

He then changed sides, and in 1647 he signed the "engagement" for the release of Charles I, losing all his offices when his enemy, the Marquess of Argyll, obtained the upper hand. After the defeat of the Scots at the Battle of Dunbar in 1650, however, Crawford regained his influence in Scottish politics, but from 1651 to 1660 he was a prisoner in England following his capture at Alyth in an incident known as 'the Onfall of Alyth'. In 1661 he was restored to his former dignities, but his refusal to abjure the covenant compelled him to resign them two years later.

Personal life
Around 1630, Lord Lindsay married Lady Margaret Hamilton (d. 1678), a daughter of James Hamilton, 2nd Marquess of Hamilton and Lady Anne Cunningham (fourth daughter of James Cunningham, 7th Earl of Glencairn). Together, they were the parents of:

 Lady Christian Lindsay (–1704), who married John Hamilton, 4th Earl of Haddington in 1648.
 Hon. Margaret Lindsay (b. 1635), who died young.
 Hon. James Lindsay (b. 1636), who died young.
 Hon. James Lindsay (b. 1637), who died young.
 Hon. John Lindsay (b. 1639), who died young.
 William Lindsay, 18th Earl of Crawford (1644–1698), who married Lady Mary Johnstone, eldest daughter of James Johnstone, 1st Earl of Annandale and Hartfell and Lady Henrietta Douglas (a daughter of William Douglas, 1st Marquess of Douglas), in 1670. After her death in 1681, he married Lady Henrietta Fleming (widow of William Fleming, 5th Earl of Wigtown), the eldest daughter of Charles Seton, 2nd Earl of Dunfermline and Lady Mary Douglas (a daughter of William Douglas, 7th Earl of Morton).
 Hon. Patrick Lindsay (later Crawford of Kilbirnie) (1646–1681), who married Margaret Crawford, a daughter and co-heiress of Sir John Crawford of Kilbirnie, in 1664.
 Lady Helen Lindsay (d. 1669), who married Sir Robert Sinclair, 3rd Baronet, of Stevenston in 1663.

He was succeeded by his son William.

References

Further reading
 

1590s births
1678 deaths
Scottish soldiers
John
17
Earls of Lindsay

Year of birth uncertain